The Allaine (  (f), in its lower course l'Allan  (m)) is a 65 km long river in northwestern Switzerland and eastern France. Its source is above the village Charmoille, in the Swiss Jura mountains. Downstream from its confluence with the Bourbeuse and the Canal du Rhône au Rhin, near Méziré, it is called the Allan. It is a right tributary of the Doubs, which it joins a few km downstream from Montbéliard, where it takes the Savoureuse with it, a river with its sources in the southern Vosges.

The Allaine/Allan flows through the following cantons, departments and towns:

Canton of Jura (CH): Charmoille, Porrentruy
Territoire de Belfort (F): Delle, Grandvillars
Doubs (F): Montbéliard

References

Rivers of Switzerland
Rivers of France
Rivers of the canton of Jura
International rivers of Europe
Rivers of the Jura
Rivers of Bourgogne-Franche-Comté
Rivers of the Territoire de Belfort
Rivers of Doubs